"The Three Degrees" is a single by Irish singer Tara Blaise from her Dancing on Tables Barefoot album, released in 2005 (See 2005 in music).

The single charted at number 9 in Spain.

Track listing 
 "The Three Degrees" (Remix) (3:34)
 "The Three Degrees" (Album version) (3:56)
 "Fall for You" (3:31)

2005 singles
Tara Blaise songs
2005 songs
Song articles with missing songwriters